Taborinsky District is an administrative district (raion), one of the thirty in Sverdlovsk Oblast, Russia. As a municipal division, it is incorporated as Taborinsky Municipal District. Its administrative center is the rural locality (a selo) of Tabory. Population: 3,574 (2010 Census);  The population of Tabory accounts for 52.7% of the district's total population.

References

Notes

Sources

Districts of Sverdlovsk Oblast